Ninth Avenue, known as Columbus Avenue between West 59th and 110th Streets, is a thoroughfare on the West Side of Manhattan in New York City. Traffic runs downtown (southbound) along the full stretch from Chelsea to the Upper West Side, except for the lowermost three blocks (from Gansevoort Street to 14th Street) where traffic runs northbound carrying traffic from Greenwich Street.

Description
Ninth Avenue originates just south of West 14th Street at Gansevoort Street in the West Village, and extends uptown for 48 blocks until its intersection with West 59th Street, where it becomes Columbus Avenue – named after Christopher Columbus. It continues without interruption through the Upper West Side to West 110th Street, where its name changes again, to Morningside Drive, and runs north through Morningside Heights to West 122nd Street.

A one-block stretch of Ninth Avenue between 15th and 16th Streets is also signed as "Oreo Way". The first Oreo cookies were manufactured in 1912 at the former Nabisco headquarters on that block.

The portion of the avenue between 14th and 31st Streets was remodeled in 2008 with a bicycle lane between the eastern curb and the parking lane, followed by another portion between 77th and 96th Streets in 2011.

Above the Lincoln Square neighborhood—where the ABC television network houses its corporate headquarters in a group of rehabilitated and modern buildings—Columbus Avenue passes through the Central Park West Historic District, stretching from 67th/68th Streets to 89th Street. There, the avenue presents a unified streetscape of 5- to 7-story tenement buildings of brick and brownstone with discreet Romanesque and Italianate details, employing cast terracotta details and panels and courses of angle-laid brickwork. Many ornate tin cornices remain. The buildings are separated in mid-block by the narrowest of access alleys, giving glimpses of Ailanthus foliage in the side-street yards. The repeated designs of three or four commercial speculative builders, using the same features and detailing, add to the avenue's architectural unity. There are several generously scaled pre-World War I apartment buildings and the former Endicott Hotel, as well as a small commercial block from the office of McKim, Mead, and White at 72nd Street.

Between 77th and 81st Streets, Columbus Avenue borders the American Museum of Natural History and Theodore Roosevelt Park.

Ninth Avenue reappears in the Inwood neighborhood as a short two-way street in two segments interrupted by the New York City Subway's 207th Street Yard. It runs from West 201st Street to West 208th Street, dead-ending at Inwood North Cove Park at the Harlem River, then picks up again at West 215th Street, and terminates at Broadway between West 220th Street and the Broadway Bridge, at the location where West 221st Street would normally be. The addresses along this upper stretch from 201st Street to Broadway are continuous with the lower portion of Ninth Avenue.

History
The Ninth Avenue Elevated was a passenger train that ran above Ninth Avenue, beginning in the nineteenth century. The lease for the line was assumed by the Interborough Rapid Transit Company (IRT) on April 1, 1903. The line ran until it was closed and dismantled in 1940, following the purchase of the IRT by the City of New York, as it was made redundant by the city's Eighth Avenue subway line.

Ninth Avenue and Columbus Avenue were converted to carry one-way traffic southbound in two stages. South of its intersection with Broadway, the avenue was converted on November 6, 1948. The remaining stretch, to 110th Street, was converted on December 6, 1951.

The Ninth Avenue International Food Festival street fair is held every year in May.

Transportation
Ninth Avenue (Columbus Avenue) is served primarily by the M7 between 66th Street and 106th Street while the M11 between Cathedral Parkway and 14th Street. The M12 and M14D+ Select Bus runs on short portions of the street.

The 1 (2 during late nights) have a station on Columbus Avenue on the IRT Broadway - Seventh Avenue Line at 66th Street and Broadway

Points of interest

 Alvin Ailey American Dance Theater, on Ninth Avenue and 55th Street
 American Museum of Natural History
 Chelsea, neighborhood
 Church of St. Paul the Apostle
 Church of the Holy Apostles
 Fordham University
 Gansevoort Market
 Hell's Kitchen, neighborhood

 John Jay College
 Lincoln Center for the Performing Arts, intersection of Columbus Avenue and Broadway (near 65th Street)
 Manhattan West
 Moynihan Station
 Port Authority Bus Terminal, 41st Street
 Roosevelt Hospital
 66th Street – the only subway station on Ninth or Columbus Avenues, serving the

Gallery

In popular culture 
 Ninth Avenue is the setting of Saul Steinberg's View of the World from 9th Avenue.
 In the TV show Seinfeld, the street set on which most of the street scenes were filmed was based on Columbus Avenue.
 In the play The Zoo Story by Edward Albee, Jerry claims to live between Columbus Avenue and Central Park.

See also

References 
Notes

External links 

 New York Songlines: Ninth Avenue, a virtual walking tour

09
Chelsea, Manhattan
Hell's Kitchen, Manhattan
Upper West Side
Morningside Heights, Manhattan
Hamilton Heights, Manhattan
Washington Heights, Manhattan